William "Bill" Leach (born April 5, 1946) is an American sprint canoer who competed in the late 1970s. At the 1976 Summer Olympics in Montreal, he was eliminated in the repechages of the K-2 500 m event.

Leach's wife, Julie, finished seventh in the K-1 500 m event at those same games and later became a triathlete in the 1980s.

References
Sports-reference.com profile

1946 births
American male canoeists
Canoeists at the 1976 Summer Olympics
Living people
Olympic canoeists of the United States